The 2009–10 Kent Football League season was the 44th in the history of Kent Football League a football competition in England.

League table

The league featured 14 clubs which competed in the previous season, along with two new clubs:
Corinthian, returned to the senior football after resigning in 2004
Fisher, new club formed after Fisher Athletic F.C. folded

League table

References

External links

2009-10
9